Jamie Chestney (born 15 November 1986) is an English male international lawn and indoor bowler.

Bowls career

International achievements
His first major international medal came in 2011 when he won the singles and triples gold medals at the Atlantic Bowls Championships. The following year he gained a bronze medal at the 2012 World Outdoor Bowls Championship in the pairs competition with Graham Shadwell. Two years later he competed for England in the men's fours at the 2014 Commonwealth Games where he won a silver medal.

He finished runner-up in the 2016 International Open and the following year won the Cooperative Funeralcare International Open.

In 2018, he won the World Indoor Open Pairs title with Mark Dawes and then won the Mixed Pairs title the following day with Lesley Doig.

In 2018 he was also selected as part of the English team for the 2018 Commonwealth Games on the Gold Coast in Queensland where he claimed a bronze medal in the Fours with David Bolt, Louis Ridout and Sam Tolchard.

Chestney won a third world indoor title when winning the open pairs at the 2021 World Indoor Bowls Championship for the second time with Mark Dawes.

In 2022, he competed in the men's triples and the men's fours at the 2022 Commonwealth Games. The team of Chestney, Nick Brett and Louis Ridout won the triples gold medal and in the fours he also secured a bronze medal.

National achievements
Chestney is a three times national champion, winning National Championship titles in 2004, 2009 and 2021. Chestney was aged just 17 when he won the pairs title with Ian Wynter in 2004.

He was also part of the Kings Bowls Club, who have won the Top Club championship four years running from 2016-2019.

National titles
2004 Bowls England National Championships (Men's Pairs)
2009 Bowls England National Championships (Men's Junior Singles)
2021 Bowls England National Championships (Men's Champion of Champions)

Personal life
In 2015, he married fellow bowls international Natalie Melmore. In 2020, he joined the Bowls England staff as a its Membership Register Project Officer.

References

External links
 
 
 
 
 

1986 births
Living people
English male bowls players
Commonwealth Games medallists in lawn bowls
Commonwealth Games silver medallists for England
Commonwealth Games bronze medallists for England
Bowls players at the 2014 Commonwealth Games
Bowls players at the 2018 Commonwealth Games
Bowls players at the 2022 Commonwealth Games
Sportspeople from King's Lynn
Indoor Bowls World Champions
Medallists at the 2014 Commonwealth Games
Medallists at the 2018 Commonwealth Games
Medallists at the 2022 Commonwealth Games